Cam Cunning (born 4 June 1985) is a Canadian former professional ice hockey player. He was drafted by the Calgary Flames in the 8th round of the 2003 NHL Entry Draft with the 240th pick.

Playing career
Born in Powell River, British Columbia, Cunning played junior hockey with the Kamloops Blazers of the Western Hockey League (WHL). After his first season, he was drafted by the Calgary Flames. He continued his junior career until 2005 when he turned professional with the Omaha Ak-Sar-Ben Knights of the American Hockey League (AHL), Calgary's affiliate. Cunning would continue in the Flames' system for several seasons, but was not called up to Calgary. His final season was 2010–11 with the Abbotsford Heat after which he became a free agent.

Career statistics

External links

1985 births
Abbotsford Heat players
Calgary Flames draft picks
Canadian ice hockey left wingers
Ice hockey people from British Columbia
Kamloops Blazers players
Living people
Omaha Ak-Sar-Ben Knights players
People from Powell River, British Columbia
Quad City Flames players
Red Deer Rebels players
Vancouver Giants players
Powell River Kings players